Hemanta Sena, the founder of the Hindu Sena dynasty in the Bengal region of the Indian subcontinent.

Biography
Hemanta was born to a Hindu Vaishnavite family, and was the son of Samanta Sena; who settled in the Rarh region. Their family belonged to the Somvanshi Kshatriya caste. 

The weakening of the Pala Empire allowed Hemanta to be granted the opportunity to govern Rarh and protect the emperors. He served this role from 1070 to 1096 CE.  His son, Vijaya Sena, reigned after him.

See also
List of rulers of Bengal
History of Bengal
History of India

References

Rulers of Bengal
1206 deaths
12th-century Indian monarchs
Sena dynasty
Founding monarchs
Bengali Hindus